Maggiori is a surname. Notable people with the surname include:

Alessandro Maggiori (1764–1834), Italian art collector and critic
Mark Maggiori (born 1977), French-American painter, graphic designer, draftsman, musician, music video director, and vocalist